Marghdari-ye Mirzayi (also Romanized as Marghdārī-ye Mīrzāyī) is a village in Sharifabad Rural District, in the Central District of Sirjan County, Kerman Province, Iran. At the 2006 census, its population was 16, in 4 families.

References 

Populated places in Sirjan County